Robert Gale Cifers (September 5, 1920 – July 1, 2001) was a professional American football halfback and punter in the National Football League for the Detroit Lions, the Pittsburgh Steelers, and the Green Bay Packers. Cifers died in a Nashville, Tennessee hospital of an unknown cause.

External links

References

1920 births
2001 deaths
People from Church Hill, Tennessee
Players of American football from Tennessee
American football halfbacks
Tennessee Volunteers football players
Pittsburgh Steelers players
Detroit Lions players
Green Bay Packers players